Cowanshannock Creek (the eastern section is sometimes referred to as the North Branch Cowanshannock Creek) is a tributary of the Allegheny River in  Armstrong and Indiana counties, Pennsylvania in the United States.

Course

Cowanshannock Creek rises in South Mahoning Township in Indiana County, Pennsylvania. It flows west into Armstrong County meandering through Cowanshannock Township, the borough of Rural Valley, Valley Township, Manor Township, and Rayburn Township.

Tributaries
(Mouth at the Allegheny River)

Craigs Run 
Long Run 
Mill Run 
Spra Run 
Huskins Run 
South Branch Cowanshannock Creek 
Spruce Run

See also
 Tributaries of the Allegheny River
 List of rivers of Pennsylvania
 List of tributaries of the Allegheny River

References

External links

U.S. Geological Survey: PA stream gaging stations
Cowanshannock Creek Watershed River Conservation Plan – DCNR
Cowanshannock Creek Watershed Association

Rivers of Indiana County, Pennsylvania
Rivers of Armstrong County, Pennsylvania
Rivers of Pennsylvania
Tributaries of the Allegheny River